The Emily Atack Show is a British comedy television series, hosted by Emily Atack and shown on ITV2. Each episode combines her stand-up shows at London's Clapham Grand with sketches and impressions, while focusing on a particular topic relevant to young women. In 2020, ITV revealed the show achieved the biggest audience for a female-led stand up show that year.

In 2021, the show was nominated for ‘Best Comedy’ at the TV Choice Awards. In 2022, it was announced that the show would be renewed for a third season; it began broadcasting on 27 September that year.

Broadcast
The first season ran for six episodes during late 2020. Following its debut season, the show was renewed for a second season in March 2021. A third season was announced in February 2022 and began broadcasting seven months later.

Episodes

References

External links
 

2020 British television series debuts
2020s British comedy television series
2020s British television sketch shows
British stand-up comedy television series
English-language television shows
ITV comedy
ITV sketch shows